SOB's is a live world music venue and restaurant in the Hudson Square neighborhood of Manhattan. S.O.B.’s is an abbreviation of Sounds of Brazil. Larry Gold opened SOB's in June 1982 with the purpose of exposing the music of the Afro-Latino diaspora to as many people as possible. It has a standing capacity of 450, and a seating capacity of 160. Gold remains the owner of the venue.

In its early days, SOB's existed on a barren stretch at the corner of Varick Street and Houston Street, just above the Houston Street subway station. The area, now known as Hudson Square, soon became trendy due to its proximity to the SoHo neighborhood. The venue's reputation began to grow with performances from Latin legends like Tito Puente, Marc Anthony, Celia Cruz and Eddie Palmieri. Brazilian artists including Seu Jorge, Ben Jorge, and Astrud Gilberto have performed at the venue, as well as more contemporary artists such as Isaac Delgado, Orquesta Aragon, Los Papines, Manolito Simonet, Septeto Nacional Ignacio Piñeiro, and Los Van Van.

Notable past performers 

Afrika Bambaataa
Alison Hinds
Antibalas Afrobeat Orchestra
Asher Roth
Astrud Gilberto
Aterciopelados
Aventura
Baaba Maal
Babatunde Olatunji
Bebe
The Black Eyed Peas
BLK JKS
Bryson Tiller
B.o.B
Bootsy's Rubber Band
Bounty Killer
Buju Banton
Bun B
Café Tacvba
Cardi B
Cee-Lo Green
Celia Cruz
Chief Keef
Chris Murray
Collie Buddz
Common
Cypress Hill
Dance Hall Crashers
David Calzado
De La Soul
Desorden Público
Digable Planets
Dilated Peoples
Dissidenten
DJ Rekha
DMX
Dorothy Masuka
Drake
Eddie Palmieri
Eek-A-Mouse
El DeBarge
Eric Roberson
Erykah Badu
Estelle
Fat Trel
Fela Kuti
Floetry
Francisco Céspedes
Frisner Augustin
Fun
Gil Scott Heron
Gilberto Santa Rosa
Grandmaster Flash
Hugh Masekela
Iann Dior
Iggy Azalea
Immortal Technique
Inner Circle
Issac Delgado
J. Cole
Jack Bruce
Jadakiss
James Taylor Quartet
Jazmine Sullivan
Joe Budden
Joe Jackson
John Legend
Jon Bellion
Jorge Ben Jor
K.R.S. One
Kanye West
Keith Ape
Kelis
Kendrick Lamar
Khalid
Kid Cudi
King Apparatus
King Changó
King Sunny Adé
K'naan
Laura Izibor
Leela James
Los Amigos Invisibles
Los Fabulosos Cadillacs
Los Van Van
Lupe Fiasco
MAX
M.I.A.
Maceo Parker
Machel Montano
Machine Gun Kelly
Mad Professor
Major Lazer
Maná
Marc Anthony
Marsha Ambrosius
Matthew Santos
Mavado
Melanie Fiona
Mephiskapheles
Meshell Ndegeocello
Mike Posner
Mobb Deep
Mos Def
Musiq Soulchild
Mystikal
Nas
Nina Sky
Nneka
Orishas
OutKast
Pete Rock
Pharoahe Monch
The Pietasters
Poorstacy
Post Malone
Q-Tip
Questlove
Raekwon
Raheem DeVaughn
Rahzel
Raphael Saddiq
Ricardo Lemvo
Rick Ross
Ryan Leslie
Sadat X
Saves the Day
The Scofflaws
Sean Paul
Septeto Nacional
Serani
Seun Kuti
Shabba Ranks
The Skatalites
The Skunks
The Slackers
Slaughterhouse
Spooky Black
Spring Heeled Jack
Stephen Marley
Styles P
Sun Ra
Swizz Beatz
SWV
Talib Kweli
Teedra Moses
The-Dream
The Roots
Tito Puente
The Toasters
Toots and the Maytals
T-Pain
Travis Scott
Usher
Wale
The Weathermen
The Weeknd
Yelawolf

References

External links
 

African-American history in New York City
African culture in New York (state)
Afro-Latino culture in the United States
Brazilian-American culture in New York (state)
Music venues in Manhattan
SoHo, Manhattan
Hudson Square